BESIX Watpac is an Australian construction and civil engineering company. Formerly listed in on the Australian Securities Exchange, it is now a subsidiary of Besix.

History
BESIX Watpac was founded by Gregory Watkins in Brisbane, Queensland as Watkins Pacific in 1983. It was listed on the Australian Securities Exchange as Watpac in 1985. During the 1980s and 1990s, it acquired a businesses in Mackay and opened offices on the Gold Coast and in Townsville, Cairns and Canberra. It also operated in Hawaii and Vietnam.

In 2004 Watpac purchased Grant Constructions, giving it a New South Wales presence. In 2007 it purchased Melbourne based JA Dodd. In 2008 it purchased JMS Civil & Mining with operations in Adelaide and Perth. Besix that had been a major shareholder since 2013, took full ownership in 2018 with the company delisted from the Australian Securities Exchange and rebranded BESIX Watpac. The civil and mining business was not included, being sold to Remagen Capital.

Notable projects
Notable projects completed have included:

Sponsorships
Watpac was the naming rights sponsor of the Townsville 400 from 2017 until 2019.

References

Companies formerly listed on the Australian Securities Exchange
Construction and civil engineering companies established in 1983
Companies based in Brisbane
Construction and civil engineering companies of Australia
1983 establishments in Australia